Mount Schumann is a mountain rising to about  southwest of the head of Brahms Inlet on the Beethoven Peninsula and lies  northeast of Chopin Hill in the southwest portion of Alexander Island, Antarctica. The mountain was first mapped from air photos taken by the Ronne Antarctic Research Expedition in 1947–48, by Searle of the Falkland Islands Dependencies Survey in 1960. This feature was named by the United Kingdom Antarctic Place-Names Committee after Robert Schumann (1810–56), a German composer.

See also 

 Mount Grieg
 Mount Hahn
 Mount McArthur

Further reading 
 J.L. SMELLIE, Lithostratigraphy of Miocene-Recent, alkaline volcanic fields in the Antarctic Peninsula and eastern Ellsworth Land, Antarctic Science 71 (3): 362-378 (1999)

External links 

 Mount Schumann on USGS website
 Mount Schumann on AADC website
 Mount Schumann on SCAR website
 Mount Schumann on peakery.com - distances and heights of nearby peaks

References 

Mount Schumann
Mountains of Alexander Island